Tiziana Di Matteo is a Professor of Econophysics at King's College London. She studies complex systems, such as financial markets, and complex materials (such as superconductors). She serves on the council of the Complex Systems Society.

Education and early career 
Di Matteo graduated cum laude from the University of Salerno in 1994. She was an Erasmus student at Queen Mary University of London. She remained at the University of Salerno for her graduate studies, completing her PhD on Josephson junctions networks in 1999. After her PhD, she became interested in the data sets of real financial markets.

Selected publications

Awards and honours 
Di Matteo was a QEII Fellow at the Australian National University. She joined the Department of Mathematics at King's College London in 2009. She has used the generalised Hurst approach to study the foreign exchange market and stock markets. In 2014 she was made a Professor of Econophysics at King's College London. Econophysics uses the statistical methods of physics to analyse financial markets.

She was appointed to the Council of the Complex Systems Society in 2018. Di Matteo is the editor-in-chief of the Journal of Network theory in Finance. She also serves as editor for the European Physical Journal B.

References

External links
Home page

Year of birth missing (living people)
Living people
Academics of King's College London
University of Salerno alumni
Alumni of Queen Mary University of London
Academic journal editors
Fellows of the American Physical Society